Suswa–Isinya–Rabai High Voltage Power Line is an operational high voltage (400 kilo Volts) electricity power line connecting the high voltage  substation at Suswa, Kenya to another high voltage substation at Rabai, Kenya.

Location

Overview
The original plan was to build a 220 kilo Volt transmission line. Plans were later revised and the voltage was increased to 400kV. The line serves three main purposes: (a) It transmits power generated from geothermal power stations in the Eastern Rift Valley, to Kenya's coastal region (b) It transmits power from thermal power stations near the coast to the industrial centers in and near Nairobi (c) Through Suswa, the power line connects to Lessos and Tororo, Uganda, allowing the export of electricity to Uganda and Rwanda.

Construction
Construction started in August 2011, with the Rabai–Isinya section. Construction was budgeted at KSh14 billion (US$140 million), funded with loans from (i) the French Development Agency (ii) the European Investment Bank and (iii) the African Development Bank. The Government of Kenya, invested equity in the project. Kalpataru Power Transmission Limited (KPTL) from India, was the lead contractor on this project. Siemens was the substation contractor. After delays, the power line came on-line in the second half of 2017.

See also
 Energy in Kenya
 Energy in Tanzania
 Isinya–Singida High Voltage Power Line
 Loiyangalani-Suswa High Voltage Power Line
 Bujagali–Tororo–Lessos High Voltage Power Line

References

External links
 Website of Kenya Electricity Transmission Company

   High-voltage transmission lines in Kenya
Energy in Kenya
Energy infrastructure in Kenya
Energy infrastructure in Africa
2017 establishments in Kenya
Energy infrastructure completed in 2017